Paxton concilians, also known as the Paxton's cardinalfish, is a species of cardinalfish native to the Indian Ocean waters off of western Australia where it is found over the continental shelf at depths of from . This species grows to a length of  SL. This species was previously classified as the only known member of its genus and of its subfamily but the 5th edition of Fishes of the World placed the genus in the subfamily Pseudaminae. The genus name honours the Australian zoologist John R. Paxton of the Australian Museum in Sydney who provided the describers with the type specimens while the specific name means the uniting of disparate parts into a whole, a reference to this species continuous dorsal fin.

References

Pseudaminae
Fish described in 1999